Arthur Rubinstein (January 28, 1887 – December 20, 1982) was a Polish-American pianist. His first recording was made in 1910, but his major recording career was between 1928 and 1976.

Overview 

Rubinstein's first recording was made in 1910; he recorded Liszt’s Hungarian Rhapsody No. 10 for the Polish "Favorit" label. The pianist was displeased with the acoustic recording process, which he said made the piano sound “like a banjo” and did not record again until after the advent of electrical recording in 1925. However, Rubinstein made numerous player piano music rolls for the Aeolian Duo-Art
system and the American Piano Company (AMPICO) in the 1920s.

Beginning in 1928, Rubinstein began to record extensively for the Victor Talking Machine Company/RCA Victor in the United States and the Gramophone Company/EMI Records (also known as His Master's Voice) in England. Rubinstein made a large number of solo, concerto and chamber music recordings  regularly until his retirement in 1976. As recording technology improved, from 78rpm records, to LPs, and from monophonic to stereophonic recordings, Rubinstein rerecorded much of his repertoire. Thus, there are often three or more recordings of Rubinstein playing the same works. In 1985, RCA began releasing some of his recordings on compact disc. Most of his monophonic recordings were not issued on CD until 1999, when RCA issued a boxed set of 94 discs containing his complete recordings for that company (along with a recording of Brahms’s Piano Concerto No. 1 which was originally released by Decca/London).  From 1937 onward, he was billed as Artur Rubinstein on concert engagements and RCA Victor's American issued recordings at the instruction of his manager, Sol Hurok.  Since 1999, all CD reissues have used the Arthur spelling, which the pianist preferred and used.

Rubinstein preferred to record in the studio, and during his lifetime only approved for release around three hours of live recordings. However, since the pianist’s death, several labels have issued live recordings taken from radio broadcasts.

This discography contains only CD reissues of his recordings.  Original issues on 78rpm, LP and tape formats are not included.

Albums

References

External links 
 [ Arthur Rubinstein] at Allmusic

Rubinstein, Arthur